Blennidus tenenbaumi is a species of ground beetle in the subfamily Pterostichinae. It was described by Lutshnik in 1927.

References

Blennidus
Beetles described in 1927